William George Waterhouse Reynolds (1860–1928) was Conservative MP for Leicester South (UK Parliament constituency).

A corset manufacturer, he won the seat in 1922 when the previous Conservative MP stood down, narrowly beating the Liberal, but lost it to the Liberals in 1923.

Sources
Craig, F.W.S., ed. (1969) British parliamentary election results 1918-1949 Glasgow: Political Reference Publications. p. 437. .
Whitaker's Almanack 1923 and 1924 editions
The Constitutional Year Book (1933), p. 198
The Constitutional Year Book (1930), p. 234

External links

Politics of Leicester
Conservative Party (UK) MPs for English constituencies
1860 births
1928 deaths
British businesspeople